José Manuel Restrepo Vélez (30 December 1781 – 1 April 1863) was an investigator of Colombian flora, political figure and historian.  The orchid genus Restrepia was named in his honor.

Restrepo was born in the town of Envigado, Antioquia in the Colombian Mid-west. He graduated as a lawyer from the Colegio de San Bartolomé in the city of Santa Fe de Bogotá. He later worked as Secretary for Juan del Corral and Governor Dionisio Tejada during their dictatorial government over Antioquia. 

From 1811 to 1814 he became a Deputy Representative of Antioquia during the Congress of the United Provinces of New Granada. After the Independence from Spain was achieved by Simon Bolivar, Restrepo became governor of Antioquia in 1819 during the Greater Colombia. 

Restrepo was profoundly interested in geography and fauna of Antioquia.

References

 Jorge Orlando Melo Revista Credencial Historial (Bogotá - Colombia). Tomo I. Enero-diciembre, 1990. No.1-12

External links

1781 births
1863 deaths
People from Envigado
19th-century Colombian lawyers
Governors of Antioquia Department
19th-century Colombian botanists
Colombian abolitionists
Botanists active in South America